In demonology, Morax is a Demon, Great Earl, and President of Hell, having thirty (thirty-two, according to other authors) legions of demons under his command. He teaches Astronomy and all other liberal sciences, and gives good and wise familiars that know the virtues of all herbs and precious stones. This profile of the demon can be seen in Pseudomonarchia Daemonum (Johann Weyer, 1577) as well as in Goetia (S.L. MacGregor Mathers, 1904).

He is depicted both as a man with the head of a bull, as well as a bull with the head of a man.

It has been proposed that Morax is related to the Minotaur which Dante places in Hell (Inferno, Canto xii). See Fred Gettings, Dictionary of Demons (1988)

His name seems to come from Latin 'morax': that which delays, that which stops.

Other spellings: Foraii, Marax, Farax.

See also

The Lesser Key of Solomon
Pseudomonarchia Daemonum
Genshin Impact - "Morax" is the name of the Geo Archon (God of Stone) who rules over the nation of Liyue. He currently resides in his vessel as a man named Zhongli, Wangsheng Funeral Parlor's consultant

Sources
S. L. MacGregor Mathers, A. Crowley, The Goetia: The Lesser Key of Solomon the King (1904). 1995 reprint: .
Johann Weyer Pseudomonarchia Daemonum (1577)

References
Footnotes

Bibliography

  
 
 
In the Clockwork Angel in the Infernal Devices Series written by Cassandra Clare, Marax is referenced to as a demon that a mundane had summoned, and had proceeded to kill the mundane and his entire family. (Page 142)

Goetic demons